The Uglysuit were an indie rock band from Oklahoma City. The lineup was made up of Israel Hindman (lead vocals, guitar), Kyle Mayfield (vocals, guitar, bass, drums), Crosby Bray (vocals, drums, guitar), Jonathan Martin (vocals, piano, organ, guitar), Colin Bray (vocals, guitar), and Dustin Maynord (bass, guitar).

Name and Formation
Their name, "The Uglysuit", is a reference to how the band members enjoy dressing up in old suits at thrift stores. The sextet met in high school, and before much time Hindman became the singer in the screamo/hardcore band Corban Eldra. The demise of Corban Eldra was the beginning of what would soon become The Uglysuit. "It was just a stage in our life. But eventually we just wanted to go from playing fast punk to really touching people's hearts," Hindman says.

History
Since their formation in 2006 they are known for the genre-bending compositions that range from breezy indie pop, psychedelic folk, shoegaze, and  rock and hopeful lyrics. Sometimes they can be considered a jam band and have been compared to Phish.  The All Music Guide called their debut "one of 2008's most promising records".

Tours and appearances
According to Spinner   Oklahoma City's indie-rock sextet the Uglysuit are currently writing "lots of new material" for their sophomore effort. Prior to playing two official showcases at SXSW 2010, one being for the ASCAP Kick-Off Party, the Uglysuit also performed at the Billions Showcase at Canadian Music Week in Toronto in early March.

In May 2010, they played 2 show in Los Angeles, CA one at the prestigious Hotel Café and the infamous Viper Room before beginning on a Summer Tour of the Midwest United States and Northeastern United States with the first performance at the Summer Camp Music Festival at Three Sisters Park in Chillicothe, Illinois.They are scheduled to appear with The Black Keys, Slightly Stoopid, Blues Traveler, Widespread Panic at the Wakarusa Music and Camping Festival in Ozark, Arkansas.  In September 2010 Jonathan Martin sat in with Umphrey's McGee and played the song "...And We Became Sunshine" with the band.

Breakup
After the summer of 2010 and multiple attempts at improving living conditions on the road, Hindman decided a healthier music environment was required for a lasting career.  The band decided that they were done with life on the road and that the Uglysuit would disband. The members of the band are all still good friends and the remaining members may at some point create a new band. A new album was recorded prior to the breakup and was released June 14, 2011.

Discography
 The Uglysuit EP (2007)
 The Uglysuit (2008)
 Awwww, Shucks (2011)

References

Rollingstone
http://www.touchandgorecords.com/bands/band.php?id=111

External links
Rollingstone
http://www.touchandgorecords.com/bands/band.php?id=111

http://www.spinner.com/2010/03/08/sxsw-2010-the-uglysuit
http://www.ascap.com/eventsawards/events/sxsw/2010/
http://stickymagazine.com/recommendations/upcoming-shows/60-canadian-music-week-2010-preview
https://web.archive.org/web/20100329013946/http://www.summercampfestival.com/2010/theuglysuit

Indie rock musical groups from Oklahoma